Amaury Golitin (born 28 January 1997) is a French sprinter. He won a bronze medal at the 2015 European Junior Championships in Eskilstuna. As a senior, he finished sixth in the 60 metres at the 2019 European Indoor Championships in Glasgow.

International competitions

1Did not finish in the final

Personal bests
Outdoor
100 metres – 10.07 (+1.1 m/s, Jesolo 2018)
200 metres – 20.94 (+0.4 m/s, Oordegem 2018)
Indoor
60 metres – 6.65 (Reims 2019)

References

1997 births
Living people
French male sprinters
Sportspeople from Cayenne
French people of French Guianan descent
French Athletics Championships winners
World Athletics Championships athletes for France
Athletes (track and field) at the 2018 Mediterranean Games
Mediterranean Games competitors for France
21st-century French people